Dominique Dupuy (16 May 1812, Lectoure – 23 September 1885) was a French botanist and malacologist.

Abbé Dominique Dupuy was a professor of natural history in Auch. He was a member of the Société Départementale d'Agriculture et d'Horticulture du Gers, the Société Botanique de France and the Société d'Histoire Naturelle de Toulouse.

He wrote Histoire naturelle des mollusques terrestres et d'eau douce qui vivent en France, par l'Abbé D. Dupuy, avec planches lithographiées, par M.J. Delarue. Paris, V. Masson, 1847–1852. Online here at Biodiversity Heritage Library

References

External links
 HUH
 IPNI (list of plants described)

19th-century French botanists
19th-century French zoologists
French malacologists
People from Gers
1812 births
1885 deaths